Geoffrey Jourdren (born 4 February 1986) is a French professional footballer who plays for as a goalkeeper. A Montpellier youth product, he spent most his career with the club, remaining first choice for many years and making 270 league appearances. He made one appearance for the France U21 national team.

Career
In July 2017, Jourdren joined Nancy on a two-year contract leaving Montpellier after 11 professional seasons at the club. Montpellier let him go on a free transfer with one year on his contract remaining. On 5 November 2018, Jourdren terminated his contract with Nancy.

He ended his playing career after being released by Nancy.

Honours
Montpellier
 Ligue 1: 2011–12

References

External links

1986 births
Living people
Footballers from Paris
French footballers
Association football goalkeepers
France under-21 international footballers
Ligue 1 players
Ligue 2 players
CS Meaux players
INF Clairefontaine players
Montpellier HSC players
AS Nancy Lorraine players